The fifth season of Supermodel Me or (Supermodel Me: Sirens) aired in 2014, with the shooting location being moved from Hong Kong to Malaysia. The judging panel this season include Lisa Selesner, Ase Wang and Dominic Lau.

This fifth season have aired, launches on Diva (Asian TV channel) and Azio TV. This season 5 was also take place in Kuala Lumpur, Malaysia for the very first time in Supermodel Me show history.

This season will feature 12 contestants; two each from Japan, the Philippines, Singapore, South Korea and Thailand, one each from Indonesia and Malaysia. The prizes for this cycle were a modelling contract with Premier Model Management in London and a cash prize of S$35.000.

The winner was 26-year-old Alexandria Brouhard from South Korea.

Contestants
(Ages stated are at time of contest)

Results

 The contestant was eliminated
 The contestant was originally eliminated from the competition but was saved 
 The contestant won the competition

 In episode 8, Victoria was originally eliminated from the competition but was saved by Lisa
 Episode 11 was the recap episode.

Photo shoot guide
Episode 1 photo shoot: Deadly Sirens
Episode 2 photo shoot: Natural shoot
Episode 3 photo shoot: Snake Instinct
Episode 4 photo shoot: Fight Club with male model
Episode 5 photo shoot: Krumping Block Party
Episode 6 photo shoot: Living Mannequins
Episode 7 photo shoot: Bold & Fearless Woman
Episode 8 photo shoot: Journey Through Time watch in an old fashion love story
Episode 9 photo shoot: Castaway
Episode 10 video shoot: Versatility as Models
Episode 12 photo shoot: Blazing Sirens

Average  call-out order
Final three is not included.

Bottom three/two

 The contestant was eliminated after their first time in the bottom two/three
 The contestant was eliminated after their second time in the bottom two/three
 The contestant was eliminated after their third time in the bottom two/three 
 The contestant was eliminated after their fourth time in the bottom two/three
 The contestant was eliminated after their fifth time in the bottom two/three
 The contestant was eliminated in the first round of elimination and placed third
 The contestant was eliminated and placed as the runner-up

References

2014 Singaporean television seasons